Soufrière may refer to:


Places

Towns and villages
Soufrière, Dominica, a village on the southwest coast of Dominica in the Caribbean
Petit Soufrière, Dominica, a village on the east coast of Dominica
Soufrière, Saint Lucia, a town in Saint Lucia in the Caribbean

Landforms
La Grande Soufrière or simply La Soufrière, a volcano in Guadeloupe in the Caribbean
Soufrière Hills, a volcano on Montserrat in the Caribbean
La Soufrière (volcano), a volcano on the island of Saint Vincent in the Caribbean

Culture
La Soufrière (film), a film by director Werner Herzog